The 2016 Summit League women's soccer tournament is the postseason women's soccer tournament for the Summit League to be held from November 3 to 5, 2016. The three match tournament was be held at Dacotah Field in Fargo, North Dakota. The four team single-elimination tournament will consist of two rounds based on seeding from regular season conference play. The South Dakota State Jackrabbits are the three-time defending tournament champions after defeating the North Dakota State Bison 3–0 in the championship match in 2015.

Bracket

Schedule

Semifinals

Final

See also 
 Summit League
 2016 NCAA Division I women's soccer season
 2016 NCAA Division I Women's Soccer Tournament

References

External links 

Summit League Women's Soccer Tournament
2016 Summit League women's soccer season